The president of the Republic of Sierra Leone is the head of state and the head of government of Sierra Leone, as well as the commander-in-chief of the Armed Forces.

As the head of the executive branch of the Sierra Leone government, the president implements laws passed by parliament. The president has influence especially over members of the party of the president in the legislative branch of Parliament. The president constitutionally appoints judges of the Sierra Leone Judicial branch, including judges of the high court, the court of appeals and the Supreme Court. The president heads a Cabinet of ministers, which must be approved by the Parliament. The president is the most powerful, and the most influential person in the Government of Sierra Leone. The president of Sierra Leone is formally addressed as His Excellency.

Eligibility for Office of the President 

 At least 40 years of age  
 Sierra Leone citizen 
 Active membership in political party  
 Fulfills all other requirements to serve in parliament

Vacancy in the Office of the President
The Sierra Leone President’s Office will become vacant if  

 The president serves over two five-year terms 
 Current officeholder dies or retires from office  
 President participates in misconduct or is physically or mentally unable to complete the duties of the presidency  

During times of war, a president’s term may be extended beyond the pre-determined two five-year terms, but only in increments in half a year at any one time  

Resignations or retirements from the office of the presidency must be given in writing. Written resignations will be given to the Chief Justice. A copy of the resignation will be given to the Speaker and Chief Electoral Commissioner.  

Any factors resulting in vacancy of presidency will result in vice-president taking on duties of the presidency and finishing out the affected president’s term. Prior to beginning duties of the presidency, the vice-president shall take the proper oath as outlined in the Constitution of Sierra Leone.  

The president of Sierra Leone is automatically: (Source: https://statehouse.gov.sl/)  

 Head of state  

 Head of Executive branch  
 Head of Armed Forces 
 Head of Cabinet with Parliament approval 

His address is known to be “His Excellency” and is a partnered appointee of Parliament.

Election
The election is through a cycle of 5 consecutive years/terms. The president is elected by an absolute majority vote and has two different rounds in which he is elected through, but has to be met with a certain step by step criteria:  

 Appointed by his own political party  
 All voters and appointees be registered in Sierra Leone 
 Polls be taken on secret ballot at specific date and time by Parliament 
 Must result in one nomination of presidency  

 If nominee passes, party organizers have seven days exactly to nominate runner up 
 The poll majority must reach a 55% approval rating  
 If tied, the default of the election winner shall go to a second-round election within fourteen days. 

The president's election must take place during the state of his office, in which the former’s would be expired following a three-month period.

Benefits and Annual Pay 
According to the Sierra Leone Constitution, the president receives entitlement and compensation salary within the office he upholds such as:  

 Receiving a salary and allowance as prescribed by Parliament and charged on a Consolidated Fund 
 Salary and allowances cannot be altered to a disadvantage or advantage  
 Exempted of personal taxes  
 Cannot be criminal charged while in office  

 Entitled to pension and retirement benefits prescribed by Parliament

Administrative Powers 

 With advice from the Judicial and Legal Service Commission, the president is able to appoint the members of the Judicature such as the Supreme Court’s chief justice 
 The president appoints the Ministers of State that make up the cabinet if they have been approved by the parliament  
 The president has the power to appoint numerous members of the government such as the members of the Judicature including the Supreme Court's Chief Justice as well as other judges that make up the Judicature with the advisement of the advice of the Judicial and Legal Service Commission, and the Ministers of State. Though the president is able to appoint these positions, those appointed will still need to be approved by the parliament in order to hold those positions.

Residence
The President of Sierra Leone official and principal workplace is at State House, located in Tower Hill in central Freetown, the capital of Sierra Leone.

The president of Sierra Leone has two official residences. The first is at State Lodge, located in the affluent neighborhood of Hill Station in the west end of Freetown; the second is at Kabassa Lodge, located in the affluent neighborhood of Juba Hill in the west end of Freetown.

The current president Julius Maada Wonie Bio uses the State Lodge at Hill Station as his official residence. The former president of Sierra Leone Ahmad Tejan Kabbah used State Lodge as his residence. Former Sierra Leone presidents Joseph Saidu Momoh and Siaka Stevens used the Kabassa Lodge at Juba Hill as their official residence.

Security and protection
The president of Sierra Leone is heavily guarded by the Presidential Guard, which is made up of a special unit of soldiers of the Sierra Leone Armed Forces and a special unit of police officers of the Operational Support Division of the Sierra Leone Police Force.

Presidential Constitutional History 
Siaska Stevens was representing the All People’s Congress (APC) party in 1967 when he won the general elections and became the Prime Minister. In 1971, the parliamentary system was abolished in favor of a presidential system. This adoption of a new constitution made Siaska Stevens the first executive President of Sierra Leone.  

Eventually, the APC would become the only recognized political party in the country. In 1978, a new constitution was adopted via referendum. This constitution replaced the multi-party system, instituting a single party state. Additionally, executive powers were increased and the presidential term limits increased from four to seven years.  

In October of 1990, President Momoh appointed a thirty-five member National Constitutional Review Commission. This was in response to the growing opposition of a one-party state. The review commission recommends constitutional changes, providing alternatives to the one-party state.

List of presidents

See also

List of colonial governors of Sierra Leone
List of heads of state of Sierra Leone
List of heads of government of Sierra Leone

References

 
Government of Sierra Leone
History of Sierra Leone
Sierra Leone
1971 establishments in Sierra Leone
Lists of Sierra Leonean people
Sierra Leone politics-related lists